The 2010–11 LEB Plata season is the 11th season of the LEB Plata, second league of the Liga Española de Baloncesto and third division in Spain. It is also named Adecco Plata for sponsorship reasons.

Competition format 
15 teams play the regular season. This is a round robin, where each team will play twice against every rival. The champion of the Regular Season is promoted to the 2011-12 LEB Oro season and the eight next teams enter the play-offs, where the winner is promoted too.

The last qualified teams is relegated to 2011-12 Liga EBA.

Eligibility of players 
All teams must have in their roster:
 A minimum of seven eligible players with the Spanish national team.
 A maximum of two non-EU players.
 A maximum of two EU players, which one can be a player from an ACP country.
 If a team has not two non-EU players, it can sign a player of everywhere.

Teams can not sign any player after February 28.

Regular season 
Each team of every division has to play with all the other teams of its division twice, once at home and the other at the opponent's stadium. This means that in Liga LEB the league ends after every team plays 28 games. The regular season started on October 1, 2010 and finished on April 15, 2011.

Like many other leagues in continental Europe, the Liga LEB takes a winter break once each team has played half its schedule. One feature of the league that may be unusual to North American observers is that the two halves of the season are played in the same order—that is, the order of each team's first-half fixtures is repeated in the second half of the season, with the only difference being the arenas used. This procedure is typical in Europe; it is also used by La Liga in football.

If two or more teams have got the same number of winning games, the criteria of tie-breaking are these:
 Head-to-head winning games.
 Head-to-head points difference.
 Total points difference.

At the final of the season:
 The regular season winner promotes directly to LEB Oro.
 Teams qualified between 2nd and 9th, joined the promotion playoffs to LEB Oro.

Team information

Regular season

Results 
Results on FEB.es

League table 

(C) indicates Copa LEB Plata champion.

Positions by round 

 Cells with "*" indicate the team didn't play that day.
 The positions are calculated using the rank system of the Spanish Basketball Federation, giving 2 points to the winner and 1 point to the loser of any game.

Copa LEB Plata 
At the half of the league, the two first teams in the table play the Copa LEB Plata at home of the winner of the first half season. The Champion of this Cup will play the play-offs as first qualified if finishes the league between the 2nd and the 5th qualified. The Copa LEB Plata will be played on January 29, 2011.

Teams qualified

Copa LEB Plata Final

Playoffs 
Teams qualified from 2nd to 9th will play the promotion play-off. If the winner of Copa LEB Plata is qualified between 2nd and 5th at the final of the Regular Season, it will join the play-offs as 2nd qualified. Three best-of-five series will decide who promotes to LEB Oro.

Stats leaders in regular season

MVP week by week

Honors

All LEB Plata team 
  Carles Bivià (Bàsquet Mallorca)
  Mikel Uriz (Santurtzi)
  Jonathan Barceló (Plasencia Extremadura)
  David Mesa (Knet Rioja)
  Ian O'Leary (Feve Oviedo)

MVP of the regular season 
  Ian O'Leary (Feve Oviedo)

Coach of the season 
  Jesús Sala (Knet Rioja)

References

External links 
 LEB Plata website in FEB.es
 Competition rules

LEB Plata seasons
LEB3